Diphyothrips is a genus of thrips in the family Phlaeothripidae.

Species
 Diphyothrips morainensis

References

Phlaeothripidae
Thrips
Thrips genera